Ricardo Brown is a Cuban-born television journalist who lives in Miami, Florida. Currently, he hosts El Factor Brown, a nightly news commentary hourly show broadcast by WGEN-TV, Channel 8, in Miami.

Career
Brown formerly worked as a reporter and assignment editor for English language WVIT in Hartford, Connecticut and as an International Correspondent for the Spanish International Network, Univision, Telemundo and CBS Telenoticias. He was News Director for the HBC National (now called Univision Radio) newscast which aired over Telemundo and for CBS Telenoticias.

Brown has covered major news events in over fifty countries in Latin America, Europe and Asia. He is a four-time Emmy Award winner. He was also News Director for the Radio Unica network, a weekly columnist for the Terra USA Internet Site, and a daily commentator for PRISA's Grupo Latino de Radio.

Currently he also works as commentator in WLVJ-1040 AM in Miami (Actualidad 1040) with the Venezuela-born journalist Lourdes Ubieta Monday to Friday from 12:00 to 3:00 p.m.

References 

 "GenTv::Contenido de Presentadores: Ricardo Brown" Bio from WGEN-TV. Retrieved Mar 29, 2010.

American television journalists
Cuban emigrants to the United States
Living people
Year of birth missing (living people)
American male journalists